Art Brut Live At Schubas 11/15/2005 is a live album by British indie rock group Art Brut. At present, it is only available in mp3 format. The album was recorded at Schubas Tavern in Chicago, Illinois, during the promotional tour for the band's first album. Although the majority of tracks on this live album are taken from Bang Bang Rock & Roll, it also contains early versions of St.Pauli and Blame It On The Trains, which later appear on the second Art Brut album It's A Bit Complicated.

Track listing

Credits
Eddie Argos - vocals
Ian Catskilkin - Guitar
Chris Chinchilla - Guitar
Freddy Feedback - Bass guitar
Mike Breyer - drums

References

https://www.amazon.com/Art-Brut-Live-Schubas-2005/dp/B00109VO32
https://www.amazon.co.uk/Art-Brut-Live-Schubas-2005/dp/B001FZY6S6

2005 live albums
Art Brut albums